This Is an Exercise is an album by experimental electropop artist Anna Oxygen, released in 2006 on Kill Rock Stars. Allmusic described the album as "just as fascinating as it is chilly and alienating. In her songs, Oxygen explores some of the same issues of authenticity, creation, and consumption that Tracy + the Plastics do, but with a sci-fi/fantasy bent."

Production and release
Oxygen composed the album herself, also handling piano, primary vocals, and sequencing. It also featured Melissa Collins on cello, Andy Gertz on accordion, and guest vocalists Kitty Jenson, Mirah Yom Tov Zeitlyn & Ginger Takahashi. Portland artist Jona Bechtolt helped Oxygen with the cover art. It was released on February 21, 2006 on Kill Rock Stars.

Critical reception

The album met with a mixed reception, with a number of reviewers writing about the album with acclaim. In a positive review for the Phoenix New Times, Ray Cummings called the album "dancey." About Oxygen's vocals, Cummings wrote that "Huff's voice recalls Linda Perry's... at its lightest, it's diva-in-training delightful. In either mode, her pipes are a perfect contrast to the rhythmically ebullient programmed synths and beats supporting them - backdrops coursing, playful, robotic, and pop basic."

In a positive review for Allmusic, Heather Phares called the album "a darker, more dramatic, and more polished affair than All Your Faded Things," also describing it as "just as fascinating as it is chilly and alienating. In her songs, Oxygen explores some of the same issues of authenticity, creation, and consumption that Tracy + the Plastics do, but with a sci-fi/fantasy bent." Phares gave the album 3.5/5 stars, also stating that "on This Is an Exercise, Anna Oxygen excels at creating a unique, sometimes disturbing sonic world with an almost-palpable sense of atmosphere."

Track listing
"Fairy Quest" – 2:59
"Fake Pajamas" – 2:41
"Dream. Dream. Dreams." – 2:26
"March of Human" – 1:40
"Hypertension" – 3:25
"R.R.N." – 2:23
"Mechanical Fish" – 2:51
"Walk" – 2:53
"Psychic Rainbow" – 2:13
"Willow Song" – 4:08
"This Is..." – 2:27
"Hold You" – 2:17

Personnel

Anna Oxygen - Composer, Cover Art, Layout Design, Piano, Primary Artist, Sequencing
Melissa Collins - Cello
Andy Gertz - Accordion
Kitty Jenson - Vocals
Mirah Yom Tov Zeitlyn & Ginger Takahashi - vocals 
Jona Bechtolt - Cover Art, Layout Design

References

External links
This Is an Exercise at Discogs
This Is an Exercise at Bandcamp

2006 albums
Anna Oxygen albums